Nothing is an uninhabited ghost town in eastern Mohave County, Arizona, United States.

History
The locals told travelers it "got named by a bunch of drunks." Nothing has frequently been noted on lists of unusual place names.

It is west of Bagdad at milepost 148½ on U.S. Route 93 (the Joshua Forest Scenic Parkway) between Wickenburg and Kingman, on the route from Las Vegas to Phoenix.

The Arizona Department of Transportation (ADOT) installed one of four motorist call boxes on U.S. 93 at Nothing.

The town sign read:

At its height, Nothing had a population of 4. The settlement contained a gas station and small convenience store.

Abandonment
Nothing was abandoned by May 2005 when Kenworthy moved on from the settlement, and by August 2008, the gas station was beginning to collapse.  An attempted revival of Nothing occurred at some time after August 2008 when Nothing was purchased by Mike Jensen. By April 2009, Jensen had opened his pizza business, run from a portable oven, with hopes of reopening the mini-mart and creating accommodations for RVs.

In April 2011, Nothing was marked as abandoned once again. The building has fresh boards in the windows, and no sign of inhabitance or any activity. More recently the building has been repurposed and used as an unofficial bathroom for travelers.

2016 promotion
In 2016, Century 21 real estate ran a "Give Dad Nothing" promotion where a free 24-hour lease to a piece of property at Nothing, Arizona could be secured for June 19, 2016 (Father's Day) only. The promotion was done with the participation of the current property owner and included a downloadable "Certificate of Nothing" and gift card.

References

External links
 Roadsideamerica.com – Nothing, Arizona (visitor stories)
 photo of Nothing, Arizona with Richard Kenworthy from digitaljournalist.org
 Field Collecting: Wickenburg Area  photos of Nothing, Arizona
 Nothing (AZ)  Black-and-white photo portfolio
 South US 93 – US 93 Corridor Map and Attractions  ADOT map showing location of Nothing

Ghost towns in Arizona
Former populated places in Mohave County, Arizona
Roadside attractions in Arizona
Populated places established in 1977
1977 establishments in Arizona